was a village located in Takaoka District, Kōchi Prefecture, Japan.

As of 2003, the village has an estimated population of 2,736 and a density of 20.81 persons per km². The total area was 131.47 km².

On February 1, 2005, Higashitsuno, along with the village of Hayama (also from Takaoka District), was merged to create the town of Tsuno and no longer exists as an independent municipality.

Pro-imperial activist Yoshimura Torataro was born there in 1837.

External links
 Official website of Tsuno 

Dissolved municipalities of Kōchi Prefecture